Pseudohoeflea  is a genus of bacteria from the family of Phyllobacteriaceae with one known species (Pseudohoeflea suaedae).

References

Phyllobacteriaceae
Bacteria genera
Monotypic bacteria genera